Yevhen Vasylyovych Pokhlebaev (born 25 November 1971 in Poltava) is a retired Ukrainian football midfielder.

Career
He capped 6 games for USSR youth team at 1991 FIFA World Youth Championship and scored one goal against the youth team of Trinidad and Tobago.

He had to retire in 1997 after complications from acute herpesviral encephalitis caused him to have severe amnesia.

Honours
Dnepr Dnepropetrovsk
Soviet Top League: 1988
USSR Federation Cup: 1989
Dynamo Kyiv
Ukrainian Top League: 1994–95, 1995–96, 1996–97
Ukrainian Cup: 1995–96
Soviet Union U-18
UEFA European championship: 1990

References

External links
 
 
 
 «Перестал узнавать даже близких». Трагедия лидера последней молодёжки СССР. www.championat.com

1971 births
Living people
Sportspeople from Poltava
Soviet footballers
Ukrainian footballers
Soviet Union youth international footballers
Ukraine international footballers
Soviet Top League players
Ukrainian Premier League players
FC Dnipro players
FC Dynamo Kyiv players
Association football midfielders
People with amnesia